Istrian Albanian was a Gheg variety of the Albanian language, spoken in the village of Katun

History 
From the 13th to the 17th century the depopulation of the Istrian Peninsula prompted the Republic of Venice to repopulate the region with settlers, which among others included Albanians. The coalescence of the various dialects spoken by the settlers led to the formation of the Istrian Albanian dialect. The only surviving text of the dialect was written by the local scholar Pietro Stancovich in the 1830s. Stankovich recorded a version of the Parable of the Prodigal Son and a vocabulary list of the dialect.

References

Albanian dialects
History of Istria
Extinct languages of Europe